The 2009 Mnet Asian Music Awards (MAMA) was the eleventh of the annual music awards in Seoul, South Korea that took place on November 21, 2009, at the Seoul Sports Complex.

Newcomer girl group 2NE1 lead the nominations with 4 counts, followed by label-mate G-Dragon, soloist Baek Ji Young, and boy group 2PM with 3 each. At the end of the ceremony, 2NE1 received the most wins with 3 out of 4 including the Song of the Year daesang award. Next to them was boy and girl groups 2PM and Brown Eyed Girls respectively with 2 wins.

Background
After ten years of holding the event under the name "M.net Korean Music Festival" (MKMF), the award-ceremony started to have a new name called "M.net Asian Music Awards" or simply "MAMA". This marked a change in concept and the way they will handle how people may vote for which artists win the awards. With its slogan "Asian Wave", MAMA was broadcast live in China, Japan, Hong Kong and Southeast Asia through Channel V International.

A VTR of artists congratulating the event was also shown including Janet Jackson, Nicole Scherzinger, Lady Gaga, Black Eyed Peas, Mai Kuraki, and Ludacris. Taiwanese artists Ming Dao, future Miss A member Wang Feifei, and Sarah also presented an award, which was broadcast live in Taiwan.

Performances
The following individuals and groups, listed in order of appearance, performed musical numbers at the ceremony.

Winners and nominees
Winners are listed first and highlighted in boldface.

Special awards
 Best Asia Star Award: TVXQ (received by JYJ)
 Best Asian Composer Award: Park Jin-young (JYP) – "Nobody"
 Hall of Fame Award: Shim Soo-bong
 Asia Recommended Award: AKB48; Lollipop F
 Lyricist Award: Park Seon-ju – "Love Him" by Bobby Kim
 Best Composition Award: Teddy – "Fire" & " I Don't Care"
 Arrangement Award: Shinsadong Tiger – "Muzik"
 Music Portal Mnet Award: 2NE1
 Mobile Popularity Award: Super Junior
 CGV Popularity Award: Super Junior
 Oversea Viewers Award: Super Junior
 Best Global Artist: The Pussycat Dolls
 Best Global Performance: Lady Gaga

Multiple awards

Artist(s) with multiple wins
The following artist(s) received two or more wins (excluding the special awards):

Artist(s) with multiple nominations
The following artist(s) received more than two nominations:

Presenters

 Jeong Ga-eun – Presenter of the award for Best New Male Artists
 Davichi – Presenter of the award for Best New Female Artists
 Baby V.O.X. – Introduced the 2nd wave
 Julien Kang – VTR – Reported Trot and Hallyu Wave via MAMA News
 Seo Young and Julien Kang – Presenters of the award for Best Trot
 Lee Yong-Woo and Hyun Jyu-ni – Presenters of the award for Best Dance
 Lee Sagan and Richard O'Neill – Presenters of Best Mixed Gender Group
 Kim Jin-pyo – Presenter of the award for Best Hiphop
 Nam Ji-hyun and Lee Seung-hyo – Presenters of the award for Best Rock
 Park Han-byul – Presenter of the award for Asia Recommended Award (Japan)
 Han Go-eun – Presenter of the award for Best House & Electronic
 Yoon Jong-shin and Hareem – Presenters of the award for Best Ballad R&B
 2NE1 and Supreme Team – Presenters of the award for Best Asia Star Award
 Kang Ye-won and Yoo Young-seok – Presenters of Best Male Solo Artist
 Park Han-byul and Hwihwang – Presenters of Best Female Solo Artist
 Nicole Scherzinger – Introduced "Nobody Syndrome" (Best Asian Composer)
 Koo Jun-yup and Junan – Introduced MAMA in Taiwan
 Ming Dao, Wang Feifei, Sarah – Presenters of the award for Asia Recommended Award (China)
 Lee Seung-yeon and CGV rep. Kang Seok-hee – Presenters of the award for Best Music Video
 Baby V.O.X. – Presenters of the award for Best Female Group
 Jin Goo – Presenter of the award for Best Male Group
 Yoon Je-kyoon – Presenter of the award for Album of the Year
 Kang Ho-dong – Presenter of the award for Song of the Year
 Kwon Sang-woo – Presenter of the award for Artist of the Year
 Tiger JK – Closing Remarks

Gallery

Controversy
SM Entertainment and Inwoo Production boycotted the event on November 21, hence none of their artists attended the event. The latter company, representing trot singers Jang Yun-jeong and Park Hyun-bin, announced the boycott and questioned the fairness of the awards ceremony. Meanwhile, the former stated through a press release that they have reservation regarding the standard of fairness and criteria used in their selections, citing that Girls' Generation had topped a music chart for nine consecutive weeks but was never placed first place on their show and only debut on their charts a month after the album was released. They also asked that their artists be removed from a mobile poll which requires participants to pay a fee in order to vote saying they "do not want to see fans suffer any damage from the poll which has commercial intentions".

SS501 from DSP Media, Son Dam-bi and After School from Pledis Entertainment also did not attend the award ceremony but cited scheduling conflicts rather than boycott.

References

External links
 Mnet Asian Music Awards  official website

MAMA Awards ceremonies
Mnet Km Music Festival
Mnet Km Music Festival
Mnet Km Music Festival